Ayapata District is one of ten districts of the province Carabaya in Peru.

Geography 
The Kallawaya mountain range traverses the district. Other mountains are listed below:

Ethnic groups 
The people in the district are mainly indigenous citizens of Quechua descent. Quechua is the language which the majority of the population (82.61%) learnt to speak in childhood, 16.22% of the residents started speaking using the Spanish language (2007 Peru Census).

See also 
 Inambari River
 Yawarmayu

References